Wolf Parade is a Canadian rock band.

Wolf Parade may also refer to their albums:

 Wolf Parade (2003 EP)
 Wolf Parade (2004 EP)
 Wolf Parade (2005 EP)
 Wolf Parade (2016 EP)